Hooah  is a battle cry used by members of the United States Army, U.S. Air Force, and U.S. Space Force. Originally spelled "Hough", the battle cry was first used by members of the 2nd Cavalry Regiment during the Second Seminole War in 1841, after Seminole chief Coacoochee toasted officers of the regiment with a loud "Hough!", apparently a corruption of "How d'ye do!" Since WWII, the word has been widely used throughout the U.S. Army and gained a more general meaning of "anything and everything except 'no'. 

It is comparable to Oorah which the United States Marine Corps uses. The United States Navy and the United States Coast Guard use  hooyah. 

The phrase originated with the U.S. Army Rangers and in the early 1980s was considered a trait of Ranger battalions, spreading locally through Fort Lewis, Washington and Fort Benning, Georgia, home of the three Ranger battalions at the time. By the late Eighties, it had spread through the majority of the Army's major and subordinate commands, quickly through leadership development schools and the more challenging courses such as Airborne, Air Assault, and Pathfinder. The speed with which it caught on is attributed to the rotation/Permanent Change of Station (PCS) of Rangers being reassigned from the "Bats" to one of the divisional units. On reassignment, their training could be put to use filling cadre slots as instructors or Black Hats by the divisions' G3 Training. As explained by senior instructor for Primary Leadership Development Course (PLDC) at Fort Ord, California in 1986, "Hooah" is always affirmative and used in various circumstances defined by the user's enthusiasm. Examples: upper case "HOOAH": "I totally agree, that's badass!"; or lower case "hooah", "yea got it, I'll get it done". Or it can be used as a question showing concern or need for clarification of intent: "Hooah?"

Possible meanings
Some popular usages of hooah include:

 HUA means: "Heard, understood, and acknowledged"

See also
 Cheering
 HOOAH! Bar – a US military energy bar
 Hooyah – the United States Navy and United States Coast Guard equivalent
 Huzzah – a 16th-century equivalent
 Oorah – the United States Marine Corps equivalent

References

External links
 About.com article with ideas about Hooah's etymology 
 About.com article with some possible definitions
 Hooah uttered at the end of the re-enlistment oath, Baghdad, July 4th, 2008: at time 1:08 on the video clip

Battle cries
Interjections
Military slang and jargon
United States Army traditions
English words